Direct coupled or Direct-coupled may refer to:

 Direct-coupled amplifier
 Direct-coupled transistor logic
 Direct coupled (applied to an engine), drives a machine directly without intervening belts, chains, or gears